(Drymonaxus feanus) is a species of beetle in the family Carabidae, the only species in the genus Drymonaxus.

References

Pterostichinae
Monotypic Carabidae genera